Walter Chambers (1824-1893) was the second Bishop of Labuan and Sarawak from 1868 to 1881. He had arrived in Sarawak in 1851, married Lizzie Wooley, another missionary and cousin of the Bishop's wife, Harriette McDougall, in 1857, and resigned in 1879. 

He died on 21 December 1893, aged 69 and he was buried in Aberystwyth.

References 

19th-century Anglican bishops in Asia
Anglican bishops of Labuan and Sarawak
1893 deaths
Burials in Wales
English expatriates
Year of birth missing